A plumb bob, plumb bob level, or plummet, is a weight, usually with a pointed tip on the bottom, suspended from a string and used as a vertical reference line, or plumb-line. It is a precursor to the spirit level and used to establish a vertical datum. It is typically made of stone, wood, or lead, but can also be made of other metals. If it is used for decoration, it may be made of bone or ivory.

The instrument has been used since at least the time of ancient Egypt to ensure that constructions are "plumb", or vertical. It is also used in surveying, to establish the nadir with respect to gravity of a point in space. It is used with a variety of instruments (including levels, theodolites, and steel tapes) to set the instrument exactly over a fixed survey marker or to transcribe positions onto the ground for placing a marker.

Etymology 

The plumb in plumb bob derives from Latin plumbum ('lead'), the material once used for the weighted bob at the end.  The adjective plumb developed by extension, as did the noun aplomb, from the notion of "standing upright".

Use
Until the modern age, plumb bobs were used on most tall structures to provide vertical datum lines for the building measurements. A section of the scaffolding would hold a plumb line, which was centered over a datum mark on the floor. As the building proceeded upward, the plumb line would also be taken higher, still centered on the datum. Many cathedral spires, domes and towers still have brass datum marks inlaid into their floors, which signify the center of the structure above.

A plumb bob and line alone can determine only a vertical reference.  However, if they are mounted on a suitable scale the instrument may also be used as an inclinometer to measure angles to the vertical.

Ancient Egyptians used a plumb line attached to the top outer part of a tool resembling a letter E; when placed against a wall, the plumb line would indicate a vertical line. An A-frame level with a plumb line hung from the vertex was also used to find horizontal; these were used in Europe until the mid–19th century. A variation of this tool has the plumb line hung from the top of an inverted T shape.

The early skyscrapers used heavy plumb bobs, hung on wire in their elevator shafts.

A plumb bob may be in a container of water (when conditions are above freezing temperatures), molasses, very viscous oils or other liquids to dampen any swinging movement, functioning as a shock absorber.

Determining center of gravity of an irregular shape 
Students of figure drawing will also make use of a plumb line to find the vertical axis through the center of gravity of their subject and lay it down on paper as a point of reference. The device used may be purpose-made plumb lines, or simply makeshift devices made from a piece of string and a weighted object, such as a metal washer. This plumb line is important for lining up anatomical geometries and visualizing the subject's center of balance.

See also 
Center of mass
Chalk line
Deflection of the plumb line
Gravity direction
Vertical direction
Zenith

References

External links 

 60 oz. Plumb Bob.
 String Line and Plumb Bob.

Inclinometers
Measuring instruments
Surveying instruments
Woodworking measuring instruments
Orientation (geometry)
Carpentry tools
Stonemasonry tools
Weights